Digno García (Luque, 1919 - Geraardsbergen, 4 February 1984) was a Paraguayan harpist. Garcia formed his own group Sus Carios with Lonardo Aquino, Antonia Alvarez and Arnaldo Peralta.

Discography
Albums
"Digno Garcia Y Su Trio Del Paraguay" (Montilla Records, 1956)
Vivo Digno Garcia 1960
Singles
A: Morena B: Moliendo Cafe Digno Garcia Y Sus Carios Palette Netherlands 1961	7" 	 
I Love Paraguay EP Digno Garcia Y Sus Carios A1: Paloma Blanca A2: Ycua Caaguy B1: Isabelita B2: Mi Bandera 1962

References

1919 births
1984 deaths
Paraguayan harpists